Warwick Mall is an enclosed American shopping mall in Warwick, Rhode Island, on the north side of Interstate 295 near the junction with Interstate 95. The mall opened for business in 1970, with Boston-based Filene's and Jordan Marsh alongside Providence-based Peerless and The Outlet, and national chain Woolworth as initial anchors, JCPenney being later added as a sixth anchor.

Since then, all the anchor stores and the interior of the mall have changed as a result of business closings and consolidations. Today, the mall has seven main anchors: Macy's on the northern side, Old Navy and JCPenney on the western side, Jordan's Furniture and Nordstrom Rack on the eastern side, and Target, Off Broadway Shoes, and Golf Galaxy on the southern side. The mall also has a large food court, complete with a carousel, in the former Peerless anchor space.

The mall was largely flooded on March 30, 2010, during historic flooding of the nearby Pawtuxet River. The mall closed for five months after the flooding, with its "Preview" beginning in August and the Grand Reopening in October. The mall's final anchor, Macy's, reopened on March 16, 2011, and just over a month later, Jordan's Furniture announced on April 20, 2011 that it will open a new store in the vacated Old Navy and Caldor anchor space on the east side of the mall.

History

Early years
Warwick Mall opened October 2, 1970, 3 years to the day after the nearby Midland Mall (later renamed Rhode Island Mall) opened. The mall opened with Filene's as its north anchor, and Jordan Marsh as its south anchor. Inline along the east side of the mall were anchors, from north to south, Providence-based Peerless and The Outlet, and national chain Woolworth.

Warwick Mall Stores as of December 1970:
 Albert's Hosiery
 Anderson-Little 
 Ann Taylor Sportswear
 ARCO Service Station
 Bobi Boutique
 C.B. Perkins Tobacconist
 Casual Corner
 Century Disc Shops
 Chandler's French Room Shoes
 Cinema I & II
 Citizens Bank (later became Citizens Financial Group)
 Educator Children's Booterie
 European Health Spa 
 F. W. Woolworth Company
 Fabric Fair
 Fanny Farmer Candy
 Filene's
 Firestone Tire and Rubber Company 
 First National Stores
 Florsheim Shoes
 Hahn's Shoes
 Hallmark Cards & Party Shop
 Hanover Shoe Store
 Joan Bari Boutique
 Jonathan's Eatery
 Jordan Marsh
 Jordan Marsh Car Care Center
 Kennedy's
 Lane Bryant
 Lerner Stores
 Mary Jane Shoes
 Morse Shoe
 Newport Creamery
 Nugents
 Peerless Company
 People's Bank
 Plum Tree
 Stowell Jewelers
 Stylecraft Shoes
 Susie's Casuals
 Thayer McNeil Shoes
 The Gentry Shop
 The Jeanery
 The London Leather Shop
 The Outlet Company
 Tie Corner
 T.L.C.
 Ups 'N Downs
 Waldenbooks
 Wallachs

By the early 1980s, the mall expanded and JCPenney had opened as a sixth anchor along the west side of the mall. Caldor would replace The Outlet Company in 1982. This six-anchor arrangement began to negatively affect the mall, however, as it could only have 70 inline stores. Rhode Island Mall had gained an edge over Warwick Mall by the late 1980s, with its addition of a food court and more store space. In 1990, Peerless vacated its anchor spot.

1990s
In 1991, the mall received a major renovation. Many of the vintage elements of the mall were removed; and today's arched ceilings and arches at the entrance were added, along with a new fire alarm system. The clock existing in the middle of the mall today is a remnant of the old design. The renovation also converted the vacant Peerless anchor space into a food court. These renovations positioned the mall over the Rhode Island Mall as the dominant mall in the area.

Rhode Island Mall received a major blow in 1992 after May Department Stores closed its G. Fox & Co. anchor, in favor of its Filene's at Warwick Mall, which it expanded. In 1996, the Jordan Marsh was rebranded as a Macy's by Federated Department Stores. Woolworth closed in 1997, and its anchor space was then leased by Limited Brands. The space was divided among a combined Express, Bath & Body Works, and Structure, which still have their own exterior entrance. Caldor went bankrupt in 1999, but Old Navy quickly filled the first level of the anchor spot, with the second floor remaining vacant. Also in 1999, the Providence Place Mall opened in nearby Providence; however, the mall saw very little impact from this.

2000s
In the early 2000s, a Showcase Cinemas opened on one of the mall's outlots, joining several other outlet stores. In 2006, as a result of the Federated Department Stores buyout of May Department Stores, Macy's moved from the south anchor (former Jordan Marsh) space to the north anchor (former Filene's) space. As a result of Macy's move, the south anchor space was left vacant. By 2009, Target opened a store on the ground floor of the south anchor space, and Sports Authority opened in half of the second floor of the same space. The other half of the second floor and the third floor of the south anchor space remained vacant.

2010s

On March 30, 2010, catastrophic flooding from the nearby Pawtuxet River left the Warwick Mall under several feet of water. A mall security guard had to be rescued by boat because of the rising waters. The mall received national TV attention, highlighting the extreme flooding in Rhode Island on that date. Six to ten inches (254 mm)  of rain fell in the area on March 29–30 in addition to the 3+ inches of rain the area received a week earlier on the 23rd.

By April 3, 2010, the floodwaters had receded. Most stores had to be completely gutted and all inventory declared a loss.

The main portion of the mall had to be completely gutted up to four feet from the floor, due to water damage. The mall concourse received a new design, its first makeover since the 1991 renovation. New flooring was installed at the end of June, with porcelain tiles imported from Italy. Other changes in the mall decor include new topiaries and gardens within the mall concourse. The characteristic carousel was salvaged and restored, soft seating areas were added and a new flat screen television was purchased for the food court, along with the installation of new public washbasins.

The businesses on outparcels of the mall, Longhorn Steakhouse, Showcase Cinemas, and Firestone were able to reopen by the start of May 2010. Sports Authority, despite being located on the second level, above the flooded area, was unable to reopen until May 17, 2010, due to repair work required for the escalators and elevator. The first business to reopen on the ground level of the mall was Liberty Travel, which reopened on June 14, 2010. Target reopened on July 11, with the next opening being Old Navy. When the Warwick Mall reopened on August 20, 2010, 25 stores were in operation. Various other stores had reopening dates in September, October and November. The last anchor store, Macy's, reopened on March 16, 2011 (a "soft-opening" was held the previous Saturday, March 13). The reopening was nearly one year after the flood.

On April 20, 2011, Jordan's Furniture of Taunton, Massachusetts announced plans to open a store in the former Old Navy and Caldor anchor space. Unlike the Old Navy store, Jordan's footprint utilizes both floors of the anchor space for its  store, its first at a mall location. Jordan's Warwick Mall store opened on December 16, 2011. Two weeks later, Nordstrom Rack announced plans to open its first Rhode Island store at Warwick Mall in the Fall of 2012 as part of a newly developed wing. Nordstrom Rack opened November 8, 2012.

On, July 28, 2016, Sports Authority closed their Warwick Mall location due to bankruptcy. In March 2020, Golf Galaxy opened their first Rhode Island store in the former Sports Authority space.

List of anchor stores

Notes

References

External links 
 Warwick Mall official site
 Labelscar: "Warwick Mall; Warwick, Rhode Island"

Shopping malls in Rhode Island
Buildings and structures in Warwick, Rhode Island
Shopping malls established in 1970